Raymond Moyer may refer to:

 Ray Moyer (1898–1986), American set decorator
 Raymond J. Moyer (1926–2014), American businessman and politician